Hommersåk is a village in Sandnes municipality in Rogaland county, Norway. The village is located in the borough of Riska in the northern part of the municipality.

Hommersåk has bus connections to the city of Sandnes and boat connections to the city of Stavanger, across the fjord. There are a few shops and a small shopping centre called Bryggen. There is also a sports centre with swimming facilities. The village and its surroundings is a popular place for cottages and leisure boats among people from the Stavanger/Sandnes area. There are two churches in the village: Riska Church and the historic Old Riska Church.  The island of Uskjo lies just off the coast of Hommersåk to the north.

References

Boroughs and neighbourhoods of Sandnes